Tara Singh (born 1 June 1955) is an Indian weightlifter. He was the first Indian to cross 200 kg in the clean and jerk event winning the bronze medal while representing India at the 1982 Asian Games at New Delhi. He was conferred with the Arjuna Award in 1982 by the Government of India.

References

1955 births
Living people
Weightlifters at the 1982 Asian Games
Medalists at the 1982 Asian Games
Asian Games bronze medalists for India
Asian Games medalists in weightlifting
Recipients of the Arjuna Award